was an  destroyer of the Imperial Japanese Navy.

Design and description
The Akizuki-class ships were originally designed as anti-aircraft escorts for carrier battle groups, but were modified with torpedo tubes and depth charges to meet the need for more general-purpose destroyer. Her crew numbered 300 officers and enlisted men.

The ship had two Kampon geared steam turbines, each driving one propeller shaft, using steam provided by three Kampon water-tube boilers.

The main armament of the Akizuki class consisted of eight Type 98  dual purpose guns in four twin-gun turrets, two superfiring pairs fore and aft of the superstructure. They carried four Type 96  anti-aircraft guns in two twin-gun mounts. The ships were also armed with four  torpedo tubes in a single quadruple traversing mount; one reload was carried for each tube. Their anti-submarine weapons comprised six depth charge throwers for which 72 depth charges were carried.

Construction and career

During the Battle of the Santa Cruz Islands, Teruzuki escorts the Carrier Strike Force. 7 of her crew are killed and minor damaged sustained from a Catalina bomb strike.

On 12–13 November 1942, Teruzuki was part of the Bombardment Force commanded by Rear Admiral Hiroaki Abe. In the First Naval Battle of Guadalcanal, she claimed hits on seven U.S. ships, including one sinking. The following morning, she assisted the crippled battleship .

On 14–15 November, she joined the Emergency Bombardment Force commanded by Admiral Nobutake Kondō. In the Second Naval Battle of Guadalcanal, she and the destroyer  provided close cover to the heavy ships. Afterwards, she assisted the crippled battleship  and helped remove survivors.

On the night of 11–12 December 1942, Teruzuki led a transport run to Guadalcanal. Fires spread over the next three hours until reaching depth charges, resulting in explosions sinking the ship.

Notes

References

External links
  CombinedFleet.com: Akizuki-class destroyers
  CombinedFleet.com: Teruzuki history

Akizuki-class destroyers (1942)
World War II destroyers of Japan
Shipwrecks in the Solomon Sea
1941 ships
Maritime incidents in December 1942
Ships built by Mitsubishi Heavy Industries